Fernando Paiva Correa (born 20 March 2003), commonly known as Fernandinho, is a Brazilian footballer who plays as a forward for Santos.

Club career
Born in Uberaba, Minas Gerais, Fernandinho joined Santos' youth setup in 2015, aged 12. On 14 December 2019, he signed his first professional contract with the club.

Fernandinho made his first team debut for Peixe on 3 March 2021, coming on as a late substitute for Allanzinho in a 1–1 Campeonato Paulista home draw against Ferroviária. He subsequently returned to the under-20 squad, and renewed his contract until the end of 2024 on 25 March 2022.

Career statistics

References

External links

2003 births
Living people
People from Uberaba
Brazilian footballers
Association football forwards
Santos FC players
Sportspeople from Minas Gerais